Sacro Cuore di Cristo Re is a Roman Catholic church (minor basilica) in Rome, designed between the 1920s and 1930s by Marcello Piacentini.

History 
The idea for a new church in the newly developed Quartiere della Vittoria (literally District of Victory, named for the victory in World War I) came from Ottavio Gasparri, member of the Sacred Heart of Jesus religious institute. At first the church was to be named Tempio della Pace, to remember and honour the fallen of World War I. Construction began in May 1920. The original design proposed by Marcello Piacentini was inspired by the churches built in Rome in the 16th century.

Construction halted with the death of Ottavio Gasparri, in 1929. In the next two years Piacentini changed radically the project, being inspired by the emerging Rationalist movement, and the Sacro Cuore di Gesù marked the turning point of the sacred architecture in Rome. The construction started again in 1931 and the church was inaugurated in 1934.

The church became a parish church under Pope Pius XI on 31 October 1926 with the apostolic constitution Regis pacifici. On 5 February 1965 was declared titular church by Pope Paul VI with the apostolic constitution Sacrum Cardinalium Collegium. Later that year, with the motu proprio Recentioris architecturae the church became a minor basilica.

Design 
The church has a brick façade with alternate courses raised and recessed; the façade is capped with travertine and the doors and windows are framed with the same material. The floor plan, with a central nave of approximately 70 metres in length and flanked by two aisles, is a hybrid of a Latin cross and a Greek cross. The hemispherical dome is 36 metres high and 20 metres in diameter. Over the main portal there is a high relief by Arturo Martini depicting the sacred heart of Jesus. Around the interior are the Stations of the Cross in bronze by Alfredo Biagini.

References 

  Luigi Monzo: trasformismo architettonico – Piacentinis Kirche Sacro Cuore di Cristo Re in Rom im Kontext der kirchenbaulichen Erneuerung im faschistischen Italien, in: Kunst und Politik. Jahrbuch der Guernica-Gesellschaft, 15.2013, pp. 83–100. ISSN 1439-0205.
 Massimo Alemanno, Le chiese di Roma moderna - Volume 2, Armando Editore, 2006 (page 32)

Further reading 
 C. Rendina, Le Chiese di Roma, Newton & Compton Editori, Milano 2000

External links
 

Titular churches
Basilica churches in Rome
Italian fascist architecture
Modernist architecture in Italy
Roman Catholic churches completed in 1934
Rome Q. XV Della Vittoria
1934 establishments in Italy
20th-century Roman Catholic church buildings in Italy